Chipeta (1844–1924) was a Native American diplomat and Indian rights advocate.

Chipeta may also refer to:

People
Mapopa Chipeta, Malawian politician
Erick Chipeta, Zimbabwean footballer
Philimon Chipeta, Zambian footballer

Places
Chipeta (commune),  one of the 618 Communes of Angola
Chipeta Golf Course, in Grand Junction, Colorado

Biology
Chipeta, a synonym of the moth genus Peoria (moth)